The 1897 Purdue Boilermakers football team was an American football team that represented Purdue University during the 1897 Western Conference football season. The Boilermakers compiled a 5–3–1 record but were outscored by their opponents by a total of 108 to 106 in their first season under head coach William W. Church. William S. Moore was the team captain.

Schedule

Players
 A. F. Alward - right tackle
 R. A. Bond, '00 - left tackle
 C. F. Breen, '98 - center
 C. E. Doan, '98 - fullback
 J. W. Esterline - fullback
 L. W. Goben, '98 - right halfback
 Herman Hall, '98 - right end
 F. D. Herbold, '99 - left guard
 L. F. Johnson, '99 - left end
 W. S. Moore, '98 - captain and left halfback
 C. S. Sample, '99 - left tackle
 R. L. Sears, '98 - quarterback
 L. B. Webb, '98 - right tackle

Coaching staff
 Head coach - William W. Church
 Manager - J. N. Moore, '98

References

Purdue
Purdue Boilermakers football seasons
Purdue Boilermakers football